The 2018 Sioux Falls Storm season is the team's nineteenth season as a professional indoor football franchise and 10th in the Indoor Football League (IFL). They are one of six teams that currently compete in the IFL for the 2018 season. The Storm were members of the United Conference in previous seasons, but due to the lack of teams, there is no conference alignment for the 2018 season .

Led by head coach Kurtiss Riggs, the Storm play their home games at the Denny Sanford Premier Center in Sioux Falls, South Dakota.

Standings

Schedule

Regular season
Key:

Postseason

Staff

Roster

References

Sioux Falls Storm
Sioux Falls Storm
Sioux Falls Storm